This is a list of Billboard magazine's Top Hot 100 songs of 1962. The Top 100, as revealed in the year-end edition of Billboard dated December 29, 1962, is based on Hot 100 charts from the issue dates of January 1 through October 31, 1962.

See also
1962 in music
List of Billboard Hot 100 number-one singles of 1962
List of Billboard Hot 100 top-ten singles in 1962

References

1962 record charts
Billboard charts